Sreeparru is a village in Eluru district in the state of Andhra Pradesh in India.
It is 22 km from the city of Eluru, the headquarters of Eluru district.

Demographics

 Sreeparru has a population of 2534 of which 1274 are males while 1260 are females. Average Sex Ratio of Sreeparru village is 989. Child population is 219 which makes up 8.64% of total population of village with sex ratio 840. In 2011, literacy rate of Sreeparru village was 66.74% when compared to 67.02% of Andhra Pradesh.

See also 
 Eluru

References 

Villages in Eluru district